The 2020–21 Kentucky Wildcats men's basketball team represented the University of Kentucky in the 2020–21 NCAA Division I men's basketball season. The team played its home games in Lexington, Kentucky, for the 45th consecutive season at Rupp Arena, with a capacity of 20,545. The Wildcats were led by John Calipari in his 12th season as head coach and play in the Southeastern Conference.

The Wildcats season was marred by inconsistent stretches. Its worst season since 1988–89, the team also suffered its worst winning percentage since the 1926–27 season. The Wildcats got off to an ugly 1–6 start (the worst since 1911) and never recovered. They finished the season with a 9–16 overall record and 8–9 in conference for 8th place. Their season came to an end when they lost to Mississippi State 74–73, ending their year also not participating in the NCAA tournament for the first time since the 2012–13 season.    

The season also marked the worst season that John Calipari had coached since 1988–89, when he was in his first season as head coach of Massachusetts.

Previous season
The Wildcats finished the season 25–6, 15–3 in SEC play to win the SEC regular season championship. They were set to be the No. 1 seed in the SEC tournament with a bye to the quarterfinals. However, the SEC Tournament was canceled amid the COVID-19 pandemic. Kentucky was announced as the league's champion following the cancellation of the tournament and, therefore, received the conference's automatic bid to the NCAA tournament. However, shortly thereafter, the NCAA Tournament was also canceled due to the coronavirus pandemic.

Offseason

Coaching changes

Departures

Additions to staff

Player departures

2020 recruiting class
On July 27, 2019, Brandon Boston Jr. committed to play basketball for the University of Kentucky over offers from Florida and Duke. Boston was the first commitment to the 2020 recruiting class, and the #2 ranked shooting guard in the 2020 class by 247 sports.

Cam'Ron Fletcher, from St. Louis, Missouri, was the second commitment in the Kentucky 2020 recruiting class. He committed to Kentucky on August 4, 2019, and chose Kentucky over Michigan State. He is a consensus four-star player by the four main recruiting services and is ranked #36 overall by 24/7 Sports.

Power forward Lance Ware, from Camden, New Jersey, was the third commitment in the Kentucky 2020 recruiting class. He committed to Kentucky on September 12, 2019, and chose Kentucky over Ohio State. He is a consensus four-star player by the four main recruiting services and is ranked #32 overall by Rivals.

Two days later, on September 14, 2019, SF Terrence Clarke from Brewster Academy pledged to Kentucky. Clarke is one of the most highly regarded prospects in the 2020 class, with most services ranking him among the top five players overall.

Incoming transfers

Preseason

In-season

Roster

Schedule and results

|-
!colspan=12 style=| Non-conference regular season

|-
!colspan=12 style=| SEC regular season

|-
!colspan=12 style=| SEC Tournament

Rankings

On January 18, 2021, Duke fell out of the AP Top 25 ranking for the first time since February 8, 2016. This broke a 59-year streak and marked the first time since December 25, 1961 that the powerhouse trio of Duke, Kentucky and North Carolina were all out of the Top 25 ranking.

^Coaches did not release a Week 1 poll.

References

Kentucky
Kentucky Wildcats men's basketball seasons
Kentucky basketball, men, 2020-21